The Lord Strathcona Medal, is the highest award which can be bestowed upon a Canadian cadet in recognition of exemplary performance in physical and military training.

Lord Strathcona's objectives in establishing his endowment were to:
 encourage the improvement of the physical and intellectual capabilities of cadets; and
 foster patriotism in cadets through the acquisition of a good knowledge of military matters.

This medal is not part of the Canadian Honours System and should only be worn on cadet uniforms.

Description
This decoration consists of a circular copper medallion with ribbon. On the obverse, in relief, is the effigy of Lord Strathcona, below the motto Agmina Ducens ("Leading the ranks"). On the reverse, the inscription "Strathcona Trust – Cadets of Canada" along the edge and "Honneur au mérite" at the centre. This medal is presented with an undress ribbon.

Criteria to receive the medal
The criteria for the Lord Strathcona Medal are found in CATO 13-16.  The criteria are the following:

 have a high level of physical fitness;
 have qualified to a training level of at least:
 Phase III in the Royal Canadian Sea Cadets;
 Silver Star in the Royal Canadian Army Cadets;
 Level 3 in the Royal Canadian Air Cadets;
 have met all requirements of their corps’ mandatory training program;
 have met all requirements of their corps’ extracurricular support training program;
 have completed three years as a cadet; and
 be regarded by peers and supervisors as exemplifying the model cadet.

References

Canadian Cadet medals and awards